Ludovic Asuar (born 26 October 1976 in Marseille) is a French former professional footballer who played as a midfielder for Olympique de Marseille, FC Metz, AC Ajaccio, Dijon FCO, CS Sedan Ardennes, and SO Cassis Carnoux.

References

Living people
1976 births
Footballers from Marseille
Association football midfielders
French footballers
Olympique de Marseille players
FC Metz players
CS Sedan Ardennes players
Dijon FCO players
AC Ajaccio players
SO Cassis Carnoux players
Ligue 1 players
Ligue 2 players